Pieno žvaigždės is one of the biggest dairy products companies group in Lithuania, uniting Mažeikiai dairy, Kaunas dairy, Pasvalys creamery and company "Panevėžio pienas" (English: "Panevėžys milk"). The current company's market value is about 70 million EUR.

Pieno žvaigždės is listed in the NASDAQ OMX Vilnius under the ticker symbol PZV1L.

The company president is Aleksandr Smagin.

References

External links 
Official website 
Official website

Food and drink companies of Lithuania
Companies listed on Nasdaq Vilnius